Bukkampatti is a Village Panchayat in Mettur  taluk in Salem district in the Indian state of Tamil Nadu.

Demographics
It has a population of about 4,206 persons in around 1,035 households. The village is famous for its export business of handloom silks.

Education Schools 
 Panchayat Union Middle School, Bukkampatti
 Government High School, Bukkampatti

References

Villages in Salem district